Peter Settelen (born 23 September 1951) is a British actor and voice coach, known for helping Princess Diana (1961–1997) improve her public speaking skills.

Early life
Settelen was born in London. He worked as an actor, including a role in three episodes of the soap opera Coronation Street, and in an episode of Thriller (1975), before becoming a voice coach.

Princess Diana (1961–1997)
He was commissioned between 1992 and 1993 to help Princess Diana develop her public speaking voice, having been introduced to her by her personal fitness instructor, Carolan Brown. Settelen videotaped Diana talking about her private life. Following her death in 1997, the tapes were seized by the Metropolitan Police in a 2001 raid on the home of Diana's butler, Paul Burrell. Ownership of the tapes was contested by her brother, Lord Charles Spencer, but they were returned to Settelen in 2004. Extracts from the tapes were screened by American broadcaster NBC later the same year, in a programme called Diana Revealed. In August 2017, extracts from the tapes were screened by Channel 4 television.

Filmography

Bibliography

References

External links
 
 

1951 births
Living people
Male actors from London
20th-century English male actors
British voice coaches